The 2004 HSBC World Match Play Championship was the 41st HSBC World Match Play Championship played and the 1st time played as an official European Tour event. It was played from 14–17 October at the Wentworth Club. The champion received €1,443,830 (£1,000,000 or $2,042,513.20) making it the biggest first prize in golf at the time. Each match was played over 36 holes. Ernie Els defeated Lee Westwood 2 and 1 in the final to win the tournament for the sixth time, (his first official HSBC World Match Play Championship victory on the European Tour).

Course

Bracket

Prize money breakdown

Actual prize fund

Breakdown for European Tour Order of Merit

Source for $US Dollar conversions

References

External links
Coverage on the European Tour's official site
Wentworth Club official site

Volvo World Match Play Championship
Golf tournaments in England
HSBC World Match Play Championship
HSBC World Match Play Championship
HSBC World Match Play Championship